Ahmed Ali Ibrahim Abdel Samad (born 15 September 1972) is a retired amateur boxer from Egypt, who is best known for winning the gold medal in the men's super heavyweight division (+ 91 kg) at the 1999 All-Africa Games in Johannesburg, South Africa. He represented his native country at the 2000 Summer Olympics in Sydney, Australia, where he was defeated in the first round by eventual bronze medal winner Rustam Saidov from Uzbekistan.

References
 

1972 births
Living people
Heavyweight boxers
Boxers at the 2000 Summer Olympics
Olympic boxers of Egypt
Egyptian male boxers
African Games gold medalists for Egypt
African Games medalists in boxing
Competitors at the 1999 All-Africa Games
20th-century Egyptian people